Dennis Reid  is a Canadian curator and art historian.

Education and career
Dennis Reid received his B.A. and M.A. from the University of Toronto. He was a professor of art history at the University of Toronto, where he taught since 1977. He worked at the National Gallery of Canada from 1967 till 1979, as Curator of Post-Confederation Canadian Art, then at the Art Gallery of Ontario from 1979 until 2010, as Director of Collections and Research.

He became a Member of the Order of Canada in 1998.

Publications
The author of numerous publications on Canadian art, including A Concise History of Canadian Painting. First published in 1973, the first edition studied Canadian painting through 1965, beginning in the French colonial period. The second edition covers events through 1980, with a new long chapter covering the intervening fifteen years that saw developing in Canada a tremendous interest in other art forms, and an apparent waning of interest in painting. Reid traces the contributions of established artists who produced steadily in the period as well as new arrivals on the scene who have since joined the ranks of leading Canadian artists. A third edition is forthcoming.

External links 
 Video: Interview with Dennis Reid
Canadian art curators

References

Living people
University of Toronto alumni
Canadian art historians
Canadian male non-fiction writers
Year of birth missing (living people)
Members of the Order of Canada